North Forney High School (NFHS) is a public high school located in Forney, Texas, and is one of two high schools in the Forney Independent School District located in north-central Kaufman County. It is classified as a 6A school by the UIL.   Varsity competition began during the 2010–11 school year, and North Forney had its first graduation in 2012.   In 2013, the school was rated "Met Standard" by the Texas Education Agency (TEA). In 2014, North Forney High School was recognized as having a certified Project Lead the Way high-school engineering program.

Athletics
The North Forney Falcons compete in volleyball, cross-country, basketball, football, powerlifting, soccer, golf, tennis, swimming, track, baseball, and softball. 

NFL safety Armani Watts played football at North Forney and graduated from the school in 2014. He played at Texas A&M from 2014–17 and was drafted in the fourth round of the 2018 NFL Draft by the Kansas City Chiefs. Watts helped Kansas City to a victory in Super Bowl LIV.

Fine Arts
North Forney Highschool boast an award winning Band, award winning Drill team (Dance), award winning Theatre and award winning Choir. These programs are well known and highly accomplished on the regional, state , national and even international arenas. 
To learn more about the Pride of Falcon Nation Band, please visit:

School uniforms
North Forney allows students to wear any solid-color polo shirt and khaki or black shorts or pants, as well as a jacket. The jacket must also be a solid color or school spirit.
 
The TEA specifies that the parents or guardians of students zoned to a school with uniforms may apply for a waiver to opt out of the uniform policy.  Parents must provide legitimate reasons, which are usually religious or philosophical in nature.

References

External links

 Texas Education Agency
 Forney Independent School District

Educational institutions established in 2009
Schools in Kaufman County, Texas
Public high schools in Texas
2009 establishments in Texas